Tarababad or Torababad may refer to:
 Tarababad, Kerman (تراب اباد - Tarābābād)
 Tarababad, Razavi Khorasan (طرب اباد - Ţarabābād)
 Torababad, Yazd (تراب اباد - Torābābād)